Katrín Jakobsdóttir (born 1 February 1976) is an Icelandic politician who has been serving as the prime minister of Iceland since 2017 and a member of the Althing for the Reykjavík North constituency since 2007. 

A graduate of the University of Iceland, she became deputy chairperson of the Left-Green Movement in 2003, and has been their chairperson since 2013. Katrín was Iceland's minister of education, science, and culture, and of Nordic co-operation from 2 February 2009 to 23 May 2013. She is Iceland's second female prime minister, after Jóhanna Sigurðardóttir. On 19 February 2020, she was named Chair of the Council of Women World Leaders.

Education
Katrín graduated from the University of Iceland in 1999 with a bachelor's degree, with a major in Icelandic and a minor in French. 

She went on to complete a Master of Arts degree in Icelandic literature at the University of Iceland in 2004, for a thesis on the work of popular Icelandic crime writer Arnaldur Indriðason.

Non-political career
Katrín worked part-time as a language adviser at the news agency at public broadcaster RÚV from 1999 to 2003. She then freelanced for broadcast media, and wrote for a variety of print media from 2004 to 2006, as well as being an instructor in life-long learning and leisure at the Mímir School from 2004 to 2007. She did editorial work for the publishing company Edda and magazine JPV from 2005 to 2006, and was a lecturer at the University of Iceland, Reykjavík University, and Menntaskólinn í Reykjavík from 2006 to 2007.

Political career
Katrín became deputy chairwoman of the Left-Green Movement in 2003, and has been their chairperson since 2013.

She has been a member of the Althing for the Reykjavík North constituency since 2007.

Katrín was Iceland's minister of education, science, and culture, and of Nordic co-operation from 2 February 2009 to 23 May 2013.

Prime Minister (2017–present)

Before becoming Prime Minister, Katrín was chairperson of the Left-Green Movement. In the wake of the 2017 Icelandic parliamentary election, President Guðni Th. Jóhannesson tasked her with forming a governing coalition to consist of the Left-Green Movement, the Progressive Party, the Social Democratic Alliance, and the Pirate Party. Coalition talks between the four parties formally began on 3 November 2017, but were unsuccessful because of Progressive Party concerns that her coalition would have too thin a majority. As a result, Katrín sought to lead a three-party coalition with the Independence Party and Progressive Party. After coalition talks were completed, President Guðni formally granted her a mandate to lead the government, which was installed on 30 November. She is the second woman to serve as Prime Minister of Iceland.

According to political scientists, Katrín's government "combines conventional economic and social emphases (e. g., support for the regions and primary industries) with opposition to European integration". Despite being a coalition government of the left-socialist Left-Greens, the centre (Progressive Party), and the right-wing (Independence Party), the coalition was stable throughout 2018.

As head of government, Katrín made taxes more progressive, invested in social housing, extended parental leave, and reduced gender pay inequality. She has had to make concessions to her right-wing partners to maintain her coalition, such as giving up the creation of a national park in the center of the country.

In September 2021, almost four years after her inauguration, Katrín remains highly popular, and leaves an image of integrity and sincerity. Her good management of the COVID-19 pandemic has been praised, with the country having one of the best health records in Europe, with 33 deaths.

The 2021 parliamentary elections were a failure for the Prime Minister's party, Left-Green Movement, which lost three of its 11 seats in Parliament. However, the coalition government retained its majority, and negotiations began between the parties to renew their agreement. Polls conducted in the days following the election indicated that a large majority of Icelanders wanted Katrín Jakobsdóttir to remain in government.

Political positions
Katrín opposes Icelandic membership of NATO, but as part of the compromise between the Left-Greens and their coalition partners, the government does not intend to withdraw from NATO or hold a referendum on NATO membership. Katrín also opposes Iceland joining the European Union (EU). The coalition government does not intend to hold a referendum on restarting Iceland's accession negotiations with the EU.

Personal life
Katrín is married to Gunnar Sigvaldason, and the mother of three sons (born 2005, 2007, and 2011). Her father, Jakob Ármannsson, was an educator and banker and her mother, Signý Thoroddsen, was a psychologist.

She hails from a family which has produced many prominent people in Icelandic politics, academia, and literature. She is the younger sister of twin brothers Ármann Jakobsson and Sverrir Jakobsson, who are both professors in the humanities at the University of Iceland. Katrín is the great-granddaughter of the politician and judge Skúli Thoroddsen and the poet Theodóra Thoroddsen.  Her maternal grandfather was engineer and MP Sigurður S. Thoroddsen. The poet Dagur Sigurðarson is her maternal uncle.

International cooperation

Katrín has been a member of the following committees:
 Icelandic Delegation to the Council of Europe Parliamentary Assembly (since 2017)
 Icelandic Delegation to the EFTA and EEA Parliamentary Committees (2014–2016)
 EU-Iceland joint Parliamentary Committee (Deputy Chair 2014–2016)
 Icelandic delegation to the West Nordic Council (2013–2014)

References

External links

Nordic Labour Journal: Katrín Jakobsdóttir - party leader during times of change

|-

|-

1976 births
Living people
Katrin Jakobsdottir
Katrin Jakobsdottir
Katrin Jakobsdottir
Katrin Jakobsdottir
Katrin Jakobsdottir
Katrin Jakobsdottir
Katrin Jakobsdottir
Katrin Jakobsdottir
Linguistics writers
Katrin Jakobsdottir
Women prime ministers
21st-century women rulers